Richard Villems (born 28 November 1944 in Pärnu) is an Estonian geneticist.

From 2004 to 2014, he was President of Estonian Academy of Sciences. From 2009 to 2014, he was Director of Estonian Biocentre.

References

Living people
1944 births
Estonian geneticists
Estonian scholars
University of Tartu alumni
Academic staff of the University of Tartu
Recipients of the Order of the White Star, 2nd Class
Recipients of the Order of the White Star, 3rd Class
People from Pärnu